The year 675 BC was a year of the pre-Julian Roman calendar. In the Roman Empire, it was known as year 79 Ab urbe condita . The denomination 675 BC for this year has been used since the early medieval period, when the Anno Domini calendar era became the prevalent method in Europe for naming years.

Events

By place

Middle East 
 King Deioces dies after a 53-year reign that has established the kingdom of the Medes and its capital at Ecbatana (later Hamedan) in what will be northwest Persia. He is succeeded by his son Phraortes, who forms an anti-Assyrian alliance with the Cimmerians to subjugate the Persians and other Asian peoples.
 King Esarhaddon begins to rebuild Babylon (approximate date).

Births

Deaths

References